Miloš Stojanović (born 25 December 1984), nicknamed Popeye, is a Serbian footballer who plays for Timočanin.

Club career
After having played in clubs such as Radnički Niš, FK Radnik Bijeljina and FK Slavija Sarajevo, he managed to achieve promotion to Serbian SuperLiga in his first season with ambitious FK Jagodina in 2008. In that season he managed to play 14 matches in the top league, but failed to score, deciding at the end of the season to move to FK Novi Pazar, thus returning to second league. After all, the decision came out to be the right one, because he ended up being an important player and one of the best scorers of the team with 9 goals in 33 matches. It was then, in summer 2010, that he decided to move abroad and signed with Slovak Superliga club FC ViOn Zlaté Moravce.

In 2011, he returned to Jagodina, where he had instant success, finishing fourth, Jagodina had managed to secure their first European competition, having played in the 1. qualification round for the Europa League. In 2013, he became the best scorer of the Serbian Super League, and led his team to glory, as Jagodina won the Serbian Cup.

On 12 June 2013, Stojanović signed by Chinese Super League side Wuhan Zall on an 18-month deal. He was transferred to Gyeongnam FC on 2014, and scored his first goal against Chunnam Dragons on March 22.

Honours
Jagodina
Serbian Cup: 2013

Individual
Serbian SuperLiga top-scorer: 2012–13

References

External links
 Player page at official club website 
 Career stats from Serbia at Srbijafudbal 
 Miloš Stojanović Stats at Utakmica.rs
 
 

1984 births
Living people
People from Knjaževac
Serbian footballers
Association football forwards
FK Radnički Niš players
FK Radnik Bijeljina players
FK Slavija Sarajevo players
FK Jagodina players
FK Novi Pazar players
FC ViOn Zlaté Moravce players
Wuhan F.C. players
Gyeongnam FC players
Busan IPark players
Milos Stojanovic
FK Zlatibor Čajetina players
Serbian SuperLiga players
Slovak Super Liga players
Chinese Super League players
K League 1 players
K League 2 players
Serbian expatriate footballers
Expatriate footballers in Slovakia
Expatriate footballers in China
Expatriate footballers in South Korea
Expatriate footballers in Thailand